Katherine Maine (born 22 November 1997) is a Canadian professional racing cyclist, who last rode for UCI Women's Team . She won the 2018 Canadian National Road Race Championships in Saguenay, Quebec.

See also
 List of 2016 UCI Women's Teams and riders

References

External links
 

1997 births
Living people
Canadian female cyclists
Sportspeople from Ottawa